Steven Bartle (born 5 September 1971 in Shipley, Yorkshire) is an English cricketer. Bartle was a left-handed batsman who bowled right-arm medium pace.

Bartle represented Leicestershire in a single first-class match in 1995 against Oxford University. Bartle scored 32 runs and bowled 2 expensive overs which cost 42.

References

External links
Steven Bartle at Cricinfo

1971 births
Cricketers from Shipley, West Yorkshire
English cricketers
Leicestershire cricketers
Living people